Dermatitis gangrenosa  is a cutaneous condition caused by infection by Clostridium resulting in a necrosis and sloughing of the skin.

See also 
 Skin lesion

References 

Gangrene
Bacterium-related cutaneous conditions